, who writes under his pen name , is a Japanese writer of mystery and horror. He is one of the founders of Honkaku Mystery Writers Club of Japan and one of the representative writers of the new traditionalist movement in Japanese mystery writing. His wife is Fuyumi Ono, a Japanese fantasy and horror writer who is known for her fantasy series The Twelve Kingdoms.

His first novel The Decagon House Murders was ranked as the No. 8 novel on the Top 100 Japanese Mystery Novels of All Time.

In 2018, a minor planet (2001 RG46) was named as Yukito Ayatsuji.

Translations
Another series
 Another,  translated by Karen McGillicuddy (Yen Press, 2013)
 Another Episode S / 0,  translated by Karen McGillicuddy (Yen Press, 2016)
 𝘈𝘯𝘰𝘵𝘩𝘦𝘳 2001, translated by Nicole Wilder (Yen Press, 2022)

Bizarre House/Mansion Murders series
 The Decagon House Murders (original title: Jukkakukan no Satsujin), translated by Ho-Ling Wong (Locked Room International, 2015)
 The Mill House Murders (original title: Suishakan no Satsujin), translated by Ho-Ling Wong (Pushkin Vertigo, 2023)

Short story
 Heart of Darkness (original title: Kokoro no Yami),  translated by Daniel Jackson (Speculative Japan 3: Silver Bullet and Other Tales of Japanese Science Fiction and Fantasy, Kurodahan Press, 2012)

Essay
 My Favourite Mystery, "Farewell, My Mask" by Akimitsu Takagi (Mystery Writers of Japan, Inc. )

His first novel The Decagon House Murders is available in French translation under the title Meurtres dans le decagone.

Awards and nominations
 1992 – Mystery Writers of Japan Award for Best Novel: Tokeikan no Satsujin (Clock Mansion Murders)
 2005 – Nominee for Honkaku Mystery Award for Best Fiction: Ankokukan no Satsujin (Dark Mansion Murders)
 2010 – Nominee for Honkaku Mystery Award for Best Fiction: Another

Bibliography

Bizarre House/Mansion Murders series
 , 1987 (The Decagon House Murders. Locked Room International. 2015)
 , 1988 (The Water Mill Mansion Murders)
 , 1988 (The Labyrinth Mansion Murders)
 , 1989 (The Doll Mansion Murders)
 , 1991 (The Clock Mansion Murders)
 , 1992 (The Black Cat Mansion Murders)
 , 2004 (The Dark Mansion Murders)
 , 2006 (The Surprise Mansion Murders)
 , 2012 (The Queer Mask Mansion Murders)

Whispering series
 , 1988 (The Scarlet Whispering)
 , 1989 (The Darkness Whispering)
 , 1993 (The Twilight Whispering)

Equation of Murder series
 , 1989
 , 1995

Blood Thirsty Killer series
 , 1990
 , 1993

Horror Stories of Midorogaoka series
 , 2008
 , 2011
 
 
 
  (Heart of Darkness)

Another series
 Another, 2009
 , 2013
 Another 2001, 2020

Standalone novels
 , 1990
 , 2002

Short story collections
 , 1995
 , 1996
 , 1999
 , 2017

See also

Honkaku Mystery Writers Club of Japan
Japanese detective fiction

References

External links
 Twitter

1960 births
20th-century Japanese novelists
21st-century Japanese novelists
Japanese male short story writers
Japanese mystery writers
Japanese crime fiction writers
Japanese horror writers
Mystery Writers of Japan Award winners
Living people
Writers from Kyoto
20th-century Japanese short story writers
21st-century Japanese short story writers
Male novelists
20th-century Japanese male writers
21st-century male writers